The city of Vienna is the county seat of Dooly County, Georgia, United States. The population was 4,011 at the 2010 census, up from 2,973 in 2000. Vienna is situated on the Flint River. It was established as Berrien in 1826. In 1833, its name was changed to Drayton. In 1841, it was renamed Vienna. Vienna was disincorporated at the time they changed the city's name to Vienna. The present name is after Vienna, in Austria.

History
Vienna was founded in 1826 as the seat of Dooly County as Berrien. Its name was later changed to Drayton.  The county seat moved to Drayton (it retained the same name), Georgia along the Flint River (Georgia) in 1836. It was later re-designated county seat in 1841. It was incorporated as a town in 1854 and as a city in 1901.

Geography
Vienna is located in southern Dooly County. U.S. Route 41 passes through the center of town as Third Street, leading north  to Unadilla and south  to Cordele. I-75 leads north  to Macon and south  to Tifton.

Climate
The climate in this area is characterized by relatively high temperatures and evenly distributed precipitation throughout the year.  According to the Köppen Climate Classification system, Vienna has a humid subtropical climate, abbreviated "Cfa" on climate maps.

Demographics

2020 census

As of the 2020 United States census, there were 2,928 people, 1,492 households, and 1,015 families residing in the city.

2000 census
As of the census of 2000, there were 2,973 people, 1,068 households, and 761 families residing in the city. The racial makeup of the city was 66.87% African American, 27.68% European American, 0.20% Native American, 0.40% Asian, 0.44% Pacific Islander, 3.77% from other races, and 0.64% from two or more races. Hispanic or Latino of any race were 5.58% of the population.

There were 1,068 households, out of which 36.4% had children under the age of 18 living with them, 36.8% were married couples living together, 28.7% had a female householder with no husband present, and 28.7% were non-families. 25.2% of all households were made up of individuals, and 11.0% had someone living alone who was 65 years of age or older.  The average household size was 2.75 and the average family size was 3.27.

In the city, the population was spread out, with 30.8% under the age of 18, 12.3% from 18 to 24, 26.1% from 25 to 44, 20.5% from 45 to 64, and 10.3% who were 65 years of age or older.  The median age was 30 years. For every 100 females, there were 85.2 males.  For every 100 females age 18 and over, there were 80.2 males.

The median income for a household in the city was $24,276, and the median income for a family was $30,574. Males had a median income of $24,063 versus $17,664 for females. The per capita income for the city was $12,419.  About 24.5% of families and 29.0% of the population were below the poverty line, including 34.1% of those under age 18 and 31.2% of those age 65 or over.

Arts and culture
The Big Pig Jig takes place in Vienna.  It is the Southeast's largest and Georgia's oldest official barbecue cooking contest. The Big Pig Jig was named to the Discovery Travel Channel's top ten list of "World's Best Barbecue Contests" for four consecutive years (2002–2005).

The Georgia State Cotton Museum is located in Vienna.

Education 
The Dooly County School District holds pre-school to grade twelve, and consists of one elementary school, a middle school, and a high school. The district has 92 full-time teachers and over 1,545 students.  The schools are:
Fullington Academy 
Dooly County Elementary School
Dooly County Middle School
Dooly County High School

Notable people
Vienna is the birthplace of Georgia governor George Busbee and the late Hollywood film director Vincent Sherman. Another notable person from Vienna is Roger Kingdom, winner of two Olympic gold medals. Florida legislator Perry Earl Murray was born in Vienna.

Senator Walter F George was from Vienna.

Glen Cassell, a great basketball coach, coached Vienna High School to 4 atate championship in the 50's & 60's

See also
List of county seats in Georgia (U.S. state)

References

External links
City of Vienna official website
South Georgia Historic Newspapers Archive, Digital Library of Georgia. Includes issues of the Vienna News and Vienna Progress newspapers.

Cities in Georgia (U.S. state)
Former municipalities in Georgia (U.S. state)
County seats in Georgia (U.S. state)
Former county seats in Georgia (U.S. state)